The 2006 Clásica de Almería was the 21st edition of the Clásica de Almería cycle race and was held on 26 February 2006. The race was won by Francisco Pérez.

General classification

References

2006
2006 in road cycling
2006 in Spanish sport